Pseudo-Ingulf is the name given to an unknown English author of the Historia Monasterii Croylandensis, also known as the Croyland Chronicle. Nothing certain is known of Pseudo-Ingulf although it is generally assumed that he was connected with Croyland Abbey.

The Historia Monasterii Croylandensis is attributed to Abbot Ingulph, an 11th-century Abbot of Croyland, but is generally accepted to be a 14th-century work. Those parts of the work written after Pseudo-Ingulf, that is in the 15th century, are considered a valuable source. Pseudo-Ingulf himself is not; while he may have had access to genuine traditions or documents at Croyland, "he misunderstood or garbled these beyond any possibility of recognition".

A number of distinguished 19th-century historians attempted to extract reliable material from Pseudo-Ingulf, notably E. A. Freeman and Sir Francis Palgrave, with limited success.

Footnotes

External links

 Ingulphi Abbatis Croylandensis historiarum, Liber I, in Rerum Anglicarum Scriptores Post Bedam Praecipui, ex vetustissimis codicibus manuscriptis nunc primum in lucem editi (G. Bishop, R Nuberie & R. Barker Typographij Regii, London 1596). digitized (Google)
 Google provides a copy of a translation of the text into English.

14th-century English historians